Taihu Road Subdistrict is a subdistrict located in the south of Hexi District, Tianjin, China. It borders Jianshan and Donghai Subdistricts in its north, Shuanglin Farm in its east and south, and Meijiang Subdistrict in its west.

The subdistrict was formed in 2017. It is named after Taihu Road, which in turn gets its name from Taihu that is located in the southwest part of the subdistrict.

Geography 
Taihu Road Subdistrict is bounded by Waihuan River in the south, Weijin River in the west, and Changtai Diversion river runs through its werstern portion.

Administrative divisions 
In the year 2021, Taihu Road Subdistrict oversaw 4 residential communities. They are, by the order of their Administrative Division Codes:

References 

Township-level divisions of Tianjin
Hexi District, Tianjin